Timothy Dupont (born 1 November 1987 in Ghent) is a Belgian cyclist, who currently rides for UCI ProTeam . In July 2018, he was named in the start list for the Tour de France.

Major results

2010
 1st Grote Prijs Stad Geel
 5th Dwars door het Hageland
 6th Beverbeek Classic
 6th Dwars door de Antwerpse Kempen
 7th Val d'Ille Classic
 7th Nationale Sluitingsprijs
 10th Omloop van het Houtland
 10th Kampioenschap van Vlaanderen
2011
 2nd Gooikse Pijl
 3rd Omloop van het Waasland
 6th Grote Prijs Stad Geel
 9th Schaal Sels
2012
 1st  Road race, National Amateur Road Championships
 1st Stage 4 Tour de Liège
 3rd Omloop van het Houtland
 5th Gooikse Pijl
 5th Antwerpse Havenpijl
 6th Binche–Tournai–Binche
 6th Ronde van Limburg
 8th Dorpenomloop Rucphen
 8th Grote Prijs Stad Geel
 9th Nationale Sluitingsprijs
2013
 1st Overall Tweedaagse van Gaverstreek
1st Stage 2
 Tour de Bretagne
1st  Points classification
1st Stages 3 & 5
 2nd Overall Tour du Loir-et-Cher
1st  Points classification
 2nd Nationale Sluitingsprijs
 6th Kampioenschap van Vlaanderen
 7th Druivenkoers Overijse
 7th Gooikse Pijl
 7th Grand Prix Criquielion
 7th De Kustpijl
 10th Omloop van het Houtland
 10th Antwerpse Havenpijl
2015
 Tour Alsace
1st  Points classification
1st Stages 2 & 4
 2nd Omloop van het Houtland
 3rd Route Adélie
 7th Classic Loire Atlantique
 8th Overall Ronde de l'Oise
 9th Grand Prix de Denain
 9th Halle–Ingooigem
 10th Kampioenschap van Vlaanderen
2016
 1st Nokere Koerse
 1st Dwars door de Vlaamse Ardennen
 1st Grand Prix Criquielion
 1st Grand Prix de la ville de Pérenchies
 1st Antwerpse Havenpijl
 1st De Kustpijl
 1st Kampioenschap van Vlaanderen
 1st Memorial Van Coningsloo
 Tour Alsace
1st  Points classification
1st Stages 1, 2 & 4
 2nd Nationale Sluitingsprijs
 2nd Grote Prijs Stad Zottegem
 2nd Grand Prix Impanis-Van Petegem
 2nd Schaal Sels
 3rd Ronde van Limburg
 3rd Gooikse Pijl
 5th Overall Tour de Normandie
1st  Points classification
1st Stages 1, 3 & 6
 5th Brussels Cycling Classic
 6th Overall Driedaagse van West-Vlaanderen
1st  Points classification
1st Stage 2
 6th Binche–Chimay–Binche
 7th Handzame Classic
 8th Overall Paris–Arras Tour
 10th Halle–Ingooigem
 10th Dwars door het Hageland
2017
 1st Grote Prijs Jef Scherens
 3rd Nationale Sluitingsprijs
 4th Grote Prijs Stad Zottegem
 5th Grand Prix Pino Cerami
 6th Arnhem–Veenendaal Classic
 7th Halle–Ingooigem
 8th Paris–Bourges
 8th Handzame Classic
 9th Omloop Eurometropool
 9th Kampioenschap van Vlaanderen
 10th Omloop van het Houtland
2018
 1st Schaal Sels
 3rd Clásica de Almería
 3rd Grote Prijs Jef Scherens
 3rd Omloop van het Houtland
 6th Halle–Ingooigem
 6th Primus Classic
 7th Scheldeprijs
 7th Elfstedenronde
 8th Overall Four Days of Dunkirk
1st  Points classification
 8th Omloop Mandel-Leie-Schelde
 8th Binche–Chimay–Binche
 9th Brussels Cycling Classic
 10th Kuurne–Brussels–Kuurne
 10th Dwars door het Hageland
2019
 1st Stage 1 Tour de Wallonie
 2nd  Beach race, UEC European Mountain Bike Championships
 2nd Road race, National Road Championships
 2nd Trofeo Palma
 2nd Schaal Sels
 2nd Omloop Mandel-Leie-Schelde
 3rd Grand Prix de Denain
 3rd Grote Prijs Jef Scherens
 3rd Antwerp Port Epic
 3rd Gooikse Pijl
 4th Grand Prix Pino Cerami
 4th Elfstedenronde
 5th Bredene Koksijde Classic
 5th Druivenkoers Overijse
 5th Primus Classic
 10th Dwars door het Hageland
2020
 2nd Grote Prijs Jean-Pierre Monseré
 3rd Grand Prix d'Isbergues
 8th Paris–Chauny
2021
 1st Stage 2 Étoile de Bessèges
 3rd Grote Prijs Jean-Pierre Monseré
 4th Omloop van het Houtland
 5th Clásica de Almería
 5th Classic Brugge–De Panne
 7th Egmont Cycling Race
 9th Le Samyn
2022
 1st Stage 4 ZLM Toer
 3rd Dorpenomloop Rucphen
 5th Veenendaal–Veenendaal Classic
 5th Kampioenschap van Vlaanderen
 6th Bredene Koksijde Classic

Grand Tour general classification results timeline

References

External links

1987 births
Living people
Belgian male cyclists
Sportspeople from Ghent
Cyclists from East Flanders
20th-century Belgian people
21st-century Belgian people